Sale' Key (born November 3, 1981) is an American football player who is a free agent. He played as a wide receiver for Idaho State University. He was signed as an undrafted free agent by the Cincinnati Bengals in 2005.

Professional career

Jacksonville Sharks
Key played for the Jacksonville Sharks in 2010 and 2011. The Sharks won ArenaBowl XXIV in 2011.

San Antonio Talons
Key was assigned to the San Antonio Talons during the 2012 season. In the month of April, Key missed 3 weeks with an injury.

Key returned to the Talons in 2013. He was reassigned by the Talons on July 11, 2013.

References

External links
 Jacksonville Sharks Bio

1981 births
Living people
American football wide receivers
American football linebackers
Idaho State Bengals football players
Idaho State University alumni
Memphis Xplorers players
Utah Blaze players
New Orleans VooDoo players
People from Citrus Heights, California
Tulsa Talons players
Jacksonville Sharks players
San Antonio Talons players
Sportspeople from Sacramento County, California
Players of American football from California
Cincinnati Bengals players